Songs from the Cool World is the soundtrack album for the 1992 Ralph Bakshi film Cool World and features songs from David Bowie, Thompson Twins, Moby, and other dance and rock artists from the time. The soundtrack would go on to chart in the Billboard 200.

Track listing

CD Track Listing

LP Track Listing

Side A

Side B

Charts

References

Albums produced by Nile Rodgers
1992 soundtrack albums
Warner Records soundtracks
Dance music soundtracks
Techno albums
Rock soundtracks
Fantasy film soundtracks
Comedy film soundtracks